This is a list of the longest gaps of time between the release date of consecutive studio albums. To appear on the list, the album must have been officially released at least a decade (to the day) after their predecessor. This list should only contain studio albums; it should not include extended plays, soundtracks, remixes, releases from various artists and compilations or greatest hits albums.

40 years or more

30–39 years

20–29 years

10–19 years

See also 

Lists of albums

Notes

References

Lists of albums by release date